Howard Stanley Brower was the second President of Hofstra University after the death of Truesdel Peck Calkins. Brower was co-executor of the estate of the Hofstra's, which led to the creation of the University. Although Brower had served as president of Hofstra he had never attended college himself.

Brower also served as Mayor of Hempstead, and President of numerous companies including Nassau Lumber Company, Brower Lumber Company, and the Reserve Supply Corporation of Nassau. He also founded the Rotary Club of Hempstead and the West Hempstead National Bank.

References

1884 births
1968 deaths
Presidents of Hofstra University
American academic administrators
Heads of universities and colleges in the United States
20th-century American academics